David Ogden Watkins (June 8, 1862June 20, 1938) was the acting governor of New Jersey from 1898 to 1899.

Biography
Watkins was born in Woodbury, New Jersey. He studied law and was admitted to practice in New Jersey in 1893. Watkins' first political foray was mayor of Woodbury, New Jersey, from 1886 to 1890. He later served on the Woodbury City Council from 1892 to 1898, and as president of the council from 1895 to 1897. He served in the New Jersey General Assembly from 1887 to 1899 as a Republican. On October 18, 1898, Governor Foster MacGowan Voorhees resigned from office, and Watkins become acting governor in his capacity as Speaker  of the New Jersey State Assembly, Serving until January 16, 1899, when Voorhees returned as governor. From 1900 to 1903 he served as the U.S. Attorney for the District of New Jersey and from 1903 to 1909 he was the state's Commissioner of Banking and Insurance.

He died on June 20, 1938, twelve days after his 76th birthday. He was buried in Green Cemetery in Woodbury.

See also
David Ogden Watkins entry at The Political Graveyard

References 

Republican Party governors of New Jersey
Mayors of places in New Jersey
Politicians from Woodbury, New Jersey
American Protestants
Speakers of the New Jersey General Assembly
Republican Party members of the New Jersey General Assembly
United States Attorneys for the District of New Jersey
1862 births
1938 deaths
Burials in New Jersey